This is a collection of lists of Celts who tend to be most associated with a modern Celtic identity:

 List of Irish people
 List of Scots
 List of Manx people
 List of Cornish people
 List of Welsh people
 List of Breton people

Lists of people by ethnicity